The president of the National Legislative Assembly of Thailand was the presiding officer within the National Legislative Assembly.

List of presidents of the National Legislative Assembly

References

Government of Thailand
Parliament of Thailand